"Online" is a song by American country music artist Brad Paisley. It was released on July 2, 2007, as the second single from the album 5th Gear. The single is Paisley's ninth overall Number One single on the Billboard Hot Country Songs charts, as well as his fifth consecutive Number One.  In addition, the song's music video won a Video of the Year award for Paisley at the 2007 Country Music Association awards. Paisley wrote this song with Kelley Lovelace and Chris DuBois.

Content
"Online" is a moderate up-tempo song whose lyrics satirize the online world, specifically MySpace. Here, the song's protagonist is a geek who lives at home with his parents, holds a job at the local Pizza Pitt pizzeria, and claims limited success in the dating world. Actually "five-foot-three and overweight," a fan of science fiction, and a mild asthmatic, the main character has an account on MySpace. There, he assumes a much more desirable yet fictitious personality: "Online, I'm out in Hollywood / I'm six-foot-five and I look damn good / I drive a Maserati / I'm a black-belt in karate / And I love a good glass of wine". Later in the song, he claims to live in Malibu, California, have a sexy, finely sculptured body, and model for Calvin Klein Inc. and GQ. His sex life amounts to being able to have a "three way chat with two women at one time", an example of double entendre. All this makes the geek claim that he is "so much cooler online." The album version of the song ends with a marching band playing the melody of the chorus, a reference to an earlier line where the protagonist claims to play tuba in a marching band.

Critical reception
Kevin J. Coyne of Country Universe gave the song an F rating. He considered the song a form of bullying because of the contrast between Paisley's superstar status and the unpopularity of the character in the song. Coyne added, "[W]hat Brad is doing here isn’t comedy. It’s sport." Allmusic critic Stephen Thomas Erlewine described the song more favorably in his review of 5th Gear, saying, "[It's] an obvious joke that comes just a bit too close to bullying, but he saves himself with his smarts — not just verbal[…] but musical, as he ends it with a marching band that delivers an aural punchline set up by the words."

Music video

Background
The music video is directed by actor Jason Alexander, who also plays the geek in the song's music video; William Shatner and Estelle Harris play his parents. Patrick Warburton has a cameo as a car dealer, Shane West has a cameo as a photographer, and Maureen McCormick is featured as the geek's next door neighbor. The marching band from Brentwood High School in Brentwood, Tennessee (who also perform at the end of the album version) makes an appearance at the end, and country music artists Taylor Swift and Kellie Pickler appear as Paisley's backup dancers. The concert portions of the video were shot at the White River Amphitheatre in Auburn, Washington, during Brad Paisley's tour, during which Swift and Pickler served as opening acts. The Matrix digital rain can be seen falling on the screen behind the band's performance.

Plot
In one part of the video, the geek's parents get into an argument over the father creating a MySpace online profile for himself. The mother intends to, in turn, create one for herself, after becoming infatuated with Paisley after seeing him performing the song. "And he can sing!", she says to the father. "I can't sing?" the father inquires. "No!" she snaps back. The father then acts hurt, a tongue-in-cheek reference to William Shatner's own long-mocked music career. Later on, during the final scene of the music video, the mother tells Paisley "marching band music makes me...hot", to which Paisley stares at the camera in horror.

Personnel
As listed in liner notes.
Brad Paisley - lead vocals, electric guitar, acoustic guitar
Tom Baldrica - tuba
Jim "Moose" Brown - B3 organ
Randle Currie - steel guitar
Eric Darken - percussion
Kevin "Swine" Grantt - bass guitar
Vicki Hampton - background vocals
Wes Hightower - background vocals
Tim Lauer - keyboards
Ben Sesar - drums
Carrie Underwood – background vocals
Justin Williamson - fiddle
Brentwood High School Marching Band, Randy Box, conductor
Roy Agee - trombone
Chris Brooks - drums
Jay Dawson - mellophone
Mike Haynes - trumpet
Sam Levine - saxophone
Joe Murphy - tuba

Chart performance

Year-end charts

Certifications

References

2007 singles
Brad Paisley songs
Songs written by Brad Paisley
Song recordings produced by Frank Rogers (record producer)
Arista Nashville singles
Songs written by Chris DuBois
Songs written by Kelley Lovelace
2007 songs
Songs about the media